A period of exceptionally cold and snowy winter weather in January 2017 occurred in Eastern and Central Europe. In some areas, flights and shipping services were suspended, and there was major disruption to power supplies and other essential infrastructure. The weather was the result of stationary high pressure over western Europe, resulting in strong winds circulating from Russia and Scandinavia towards eastern Europe. On 9 January, the Continental Arctic (cA) air mass extended from Germany across the Balkans, resulting in deep snow in Greece and strong bora winds affecting Croatia in particular. In addition, heavy snow in central and Southern Italy was the result of cold air flowing across the warmer Adriatic Sea. At least 73 deaths were attributed to the cold wave.

Affected areas 
During the first week of 2017, 46 (mainly homeless) people died from the cold in Poland, when temperatures fell below . Free public transport was provided in Warsaw, Kraków and Kielce because of the smog caused by the cold weather. Wrocław was also affected by smog with air quality in the area dropping to critical levels. Seven cold-related deaths were reported in Italy as of 9 January, mainly of homeless people, and parts of the country experienced exceptional falls of snow, high winds and freezing temperatures. Several airports were closed, including those in Sicily, Bari and Brindisi. Ice formed on the Adriatic Sea, and schools in the south of the country were closed. On 10 January, shipping was halted along a  stretch of the Danube in Romania, Croatia and Serbia, because of the icy conditions.

Eight deaths from the cold were reported in the Czech Republic, mainly of homeless people. The bodies of three migrants were found near the border between Bulgaria and Turkey. Médecins Sans Frontières raised concerns about the risk to migrants, especially around 2,000 people living in Belgrade. The Bosphorus was closed to shipping after a snowstorm that also affected services in Istanbul, Turkey, where more than 650 flights were grounded. Blizzards affected Bulgaria and also parts of Romania and Ukraine, and shipping on the Danube was suspended.

Greek authorities decided in 2016 in Greece to name extreme weather phenomena starting from January 2017; Ariadne was the first weather phenomenon to receive a name. The whole country was blanketed by unusually heavy snowfall, causing huge problems in transport. Snow even fell in Athens and Santorini. One migrant died of cold, and many migrants on islands in the Aegean Sea were moved into heated tents as the area was covered in snow. The authorities opened three Athens Metro tube stations to homeless people to help protect them from the cold. Road and public transport in the country were also disrupted. On 10 January, it was announced that in Thessaloniki in the province of Macedonia only 130 buses out of 480–500 operated by Thessaloniki Urban Transport Organisation were in operational condition. The islands of Euboea, Skopelos and Alonnisos declared a state of emergency after serious power failures and collapse of traffic due to snowfall.

Deaths were also reported in Russia and Ukraine. Temperatures in some parts of European Russia fell to below , setting records across the region. About 100,000 residents of settlements in Moscow Oblast such as Lyubertsy, Lytkarino, Dzerzhinsky and Kotelniki lost electricity due to extremely harsh temperatures. On 11 January, the cold wave reached Albania, with temperatures reaching  and supplies being flown in by army helicopters, mainly in the city of Gjirokastër and the nation's capital Tirana.

On 16 January, it was reported that the electricity prices in Europe were at their highest since 2008 as a result of power outages and increased demand. Romanian Energy Minister, Toma Petcu, suggested that, if coal consumption remained high, reserves held by the country's two major producers would only last for four days.

Temperature records

Minimum Temperatures measured during the cold wave 
 

 Rome: -2°C (7th Jan, 0750 hrs) 
 Florence: -7°C (9th Jan, 0750 hrs) 
 Naples: -5°C (8th Jan, 0550 hrs) 
 Milan: -6°C (7th Jan, 0720 hrs) 
 Athens: -1°C (9th Jan, 0500 hrs) 
 Zurich: -12°C (7th Jan, 0400 hrs) 
 Bern: -17°C (6th Jan, 0820 hrs) 
 Dresden: -12°C (6th Jan, 0450 hrs) 
 Moscow: -30°C (7th Jan, 0900 hrs) 
 Vienna: -4°C (7th Jan, 0450 hrs) 
 Budapest: -22°C (8th Jan, 0400 hrs) 
 Ljubljana: -13°C (11th Jan, 0600 hrs) 
 Prague: -16°C (7th Jan, 0400 hrs) 
 Bratislava: -14°C (11th Jan, 0130 hrs) 
 Belgrade: -15°C (8th Jan, 0700 hrs) 
 Sarajevo: -26°C (8th Jan, 0630 hrs) 
 Riga: -21°C (7th Jan, 0220 hrs)  
 Warsaw: -20°C (7th Jan, 0800 hrs) 
 Minsk: -26°C (7th Jan, 0800 hrs) 
 Kiev: -19°C (7th Jan, 0800 hrs) 
 Bitola: -23°C (8th Jan, 0700 hrs) 
 Sofia: -16°C (11th Jan, 0800 hrs) 
 Malovište: -23°C (8th Jan, 0700 hrs) 
 Pristina: -22°C (8th Jan, 0700 hrs) 
 Vilnius: -23°C (7th Jan, 0550 hrs) 
 Mitrovica: -22°C (8th Jan, 0700 hrs)

Deaths
At least 61 people died in relation to the cold, many of them migrants or homeless. Approximately one-third of the deaths were in Poland; others took place in Albania, Bulgaria, the Czech Republic, Italy, Greece, and North Macedonia.

See also 
 Rigopiano avalanche
Early 2014 North American cold wave
Early 2012 European cold wave
2006 European cold wave
2006 European heat wave
2003 European heat wave

References

Sources

External links

2017 cold waves
Cold waves in Europe
January 2017 events in Europe
January 2017 events in Italy